Robert A. Bennett (born 1941) is an American banking and finance journalist who worked for The New York Times and U.S. Banker (also previously known as United States Banker). Bennett wrote for The New York Times between 1977–1989, most in his official capacity as the newspaper's Banking Correspondent (1979–1988). After his tenure at The New York Times, Bennett served as Editor of U.S. Banker from 1988–1992 and, later, as Editor-in-Chief from 2000-2002.

At the time of his hiring by U.S. Banker in 1988, the Publisher, Andrew L. Goodenough, called Bennett, "the nation's premier banking editor." Goodenough described Bennett's reach in the financial world: "[Robert A. Bennett] is known personally by most of the nation's financial institution leaders; the rest most certainly know him by name and reputation. His byline has been seen by every business leader in New York, across the country, and even the world."

During his forty-plus years in banking and finance journalism, Bennett also wrote and worked for other financial publications, including American Banker and The Bond Buyer.

References

External links 
 The New York Times
 US Banker
 American Banker
 The Bond Buyer

Living people
1941 births
American business and financial journalists
American male journalists